Ferocious Dog are an English folk punk band from Warsop, Nottinghamshire, England. The band has headlined tours of the UK and Europe, performed in Dubai, festivals such as Bearded Theory, Alchemy, Deerstock, Farmer Phil's Festival, Splendour and Beautiful Days, and toured in support of New Model Army, The Levellers and The Wonder Stuff. In 2015 the band played in the Field of Avalon at Glastonbury Festival, attracting the third largest crowd to the stage over the course of the weekend.

History
The band released a number of EPs before a first album on Weird Sounds in 2013, described by Louder Than War as "startlingly good, and so it should be, it’s been many years in the making".  The album has been reviewed positively in both folk and metal sources.

On 11 February 2015, Ferocious Dog announced that they would be releasing a second album, From Without, this was funded by fans pre-ordering the album in advance.  It was produced by Matt Terry and mastered by Al Scott.  It was released in October 2015 after single releases of "Ruby Bridges" in June 2015 and "Slow Motion Suicide" in August 2015.

Touring the new material started at The Bodega in Nottingham on 7 March 2015, the first live appearance with the new line-up including Leslie Carter on guitar and Scott Walters on drums -  it sold out in 22 minutes. This kicked off a busy year of touring and festivals, culminating in a sell-out home town gig at Rock City in Nottingham.  Ferocious Dog are the first independent act to sell-out the venue in its 35-year history. The band encouraged those attending to bring items for a local food bank to the gig, completely swamping the room Rock City had put aside to store them in the process.  The gig was filmed and recorded, and released as a CD and DVD.  2016 ended with a UK and European tour supporting The Levellers, including shows in the Netherland and Germany.  Further shows in the Netherlands were played in February 2017.

Fans 
Fans of Ferocious Dog are affectionately referred to as 'Hell Hounds' - taking their name from the Ferocious Dog song.  They have a growing renown for lively mosh pits and increasingly elaborate stacking routines during the band's performances.  Many of them have been tattooed with the Ferocious Dog fighting dogs logo by lead singer Ken Bonsall, a former coal miner who now operates as a tattoo artist.

Lee Bonsall 
Pivotal to the ethos and drive of Ferocious Dog is the sad fate of Ken's son Lee.  Lee served in Afghanistan from the age of 18, and upon rejoining civilian life took his own life in 2012 at the age of just 24, unable to overcome the post traumatic stress disorder he was suffering from stemming from one of his friends being killed by a sniper.  Lee is commemorated in the songs "The Glass, Lee's Tune" and "A Verse for Lee" on their first album.  This gave rise to The Lee Bonsall Memorial Fund which is a constant focus for fundraising and awareness building by the band.  Lee's story was featured in the BBC documentary Broken by Battle. Lee Bonsall gave the band their name as a child.

Discography

Albums

EPs and singles
"Ferocious Dog" (2011)
"Hell Hounds" (2012)
"Revolution" (2012)
"Ruby Bridges" (2015)
"Slow Motion Suicide" (2015)
"American Dream" (2017)
"The Landscape Artist" (2018)
"Psychedelic Spin" with Dr. Peacock (2019)

Other media
Live at Rock City (CD/DVD) (2016)
Live at the Rescue Rooms (CD/DVD) (2018)

Members

Current
 Ken Bonsall - Vocals, Acoustic Guitar (1988–present)
 Jamie Burney - Violin (2022 –present)
 Kyle Peters - Electric Guitar (2010 - 2014, 2022-present)
 Luke Grainger - Percussion (2022 -present)
 Nick Wragg - Bassist (2022 -present)
 Sam Wood - Banjo, Mandolin, Bouzouki, Acoustic Guitar, Whistles, Accordion (2021-present)

Former
 Dan Booth - Violin (1988–2022)
 Dave Drury - Bass Guitar (1988 - 2014)
 Brad Drury - Drums (2010 - 2014)
 'Mushy' - Drums (2014 - 2015) 
 Scott Walters - Drums (2015–2017)
 Ellis Waring - Acoustic Guitar, Mandolin, Bouzouki, Banjo (2010–2017)
 John Leonard - Guitars, Banjo, Mandolin, Tin Whistle, Uilleann pipes (2017–2019)
 Leslie Carter - Electric Guitar (2015–2019)
 Johnny Edwards - Banjo, Acoustic Guitar, Mandolin, Accordion, Whistle, Harmonica, Mandola (2019 - 2021)
Ryan Brooks - Electric Guitar (2019 - 2022)
 John Alexander - Bass Guitar (2014-2022)
 Alex Smith - Drums (2017-2022)

Crew
 Pete Wagstaff - (2007-2017)
 Dominic Baschek - (2012-2015)
 Darren Hallsworth - Stage Technician, Guitar Technician (2018-2021)
 Luke Top Nob Wheatley - Sound engineer, Head Technician
 Paul Bateman - Merchandise

References

External links
 Official website
 BBC artists Ferocious Dog page

English punk rock groups
English folk musical groups
Folk punk groups